Ng See-yuen (born 6 June 1944) is a Hong Kong film producer, director, screenwriter and businessman.

He has been active in the Hong Kong film industry since 1970, particularly in action films. He was one of the first filmmakers to find widespread success outside of the major studios of Shaw Brothers and Golden Harvest, as the founder of Seasonal Film Corporation, where he helped launch the careers of Jackie Chan, Jimmy Wang Yu, Corey Yuen, Jean-Claude Van Damme, Hiroyuki Sanada, Jet Li and Wu Jing. He has been twice nominated for the Hong Kong Film Award for Best Film, for The Unwritten Law (1985) and The Soong Sisters (1997).

Ng is an Honorary President of the Hong Kong Film Directors' Guild, a former President of the Federation of Hong Kong Filmmakers, and was President of the Hong Kong Film Awards Association from 1995 to 2000. He is also a co-founder of the UME Huaxing International Cinema chain, and the owner of the Hong Kong A1 Division basketball club Seasonal.

Early life 
Ng See-yuen was born in Shanghai, the under Japanese occupation, on June 6, 1944. He and his family moved to British Hong Kong in 1961, where he attended New Method College in Kowloon. He worked as a security guard and a secondary school teacher before entering the film industry.

History

Filmmaking
His career in the industry began as an executive at Shaw Brothers Studio. The first film he was involved in was The Chinese Boxer (1970), on which he worked as assistant director to film director Jimmy Wang Yu.
In 1975, he founded Seasonal Film Corporation. The first film produced by the company was Secret Rivals in 1976, which Ng also directed.

Ng produced and co-wrote Snake in the Eagle's Shadow (1978) and Drunken Master, which were the first films directed by Yuen Woo-ping and were Jackie Chan's first real successes at the domestic box office.

In 1985, Ng was the first Hong Kong producer to make a film in the USA that successfully showed the Hong Kong style of action, when he worked with Corey Yuen on No Retreat, No Surrender, which starred then unknowns Kurt McKinney and Jean-Claude Van Damme.

Other notable films that Ng See-yuen worked on include Ninja in the Dragon's Den (as co-writer and producer) and Legend of a Fighter (as producer and writer), both in 1982. He also co-produced Jackie Chan's 1992 film Twin Dragons, and four of the Once Upon a Time in China series.

Still working in the industry, he produced Alfred Cheung's romantic comedy Contract Lover in 2007, and is credited as presenter for the 2008 film Legendary Assassin.

Other industry roles
Ng See-yuen is an Honorary Advisor and jury member for the Asian Film Awards. He holds several additional titles including Chairman of the Federation of Hong Kong Filmmakers, Honorary Permanent President of the Hong Kong Film Directors' Guild, and Advisor of the Hong Kong International Film Festival.
In April 2007, he became an official member of the Hong Kong Film Development Council. In this capacity, he has been a vocal advocate for the introduction of a motion picture rating system in China and has spoken out on issues such as Mainland China's policies toward the co-production of films with other nations and censorship.

Ng is also the founder of "UME International Cineplex," one of the largest cinema chains in China, with five-star cineplexes in Guangzhou, Shanghai, Chongqing, Hangzhou and an IMAX cineplex in Beijing. "UME" is an acronym for Ultimate Movie Experience.

Filmography
As director
 Feng kuang sha shou (1971)
 Bloody Fists (1972); also writer
 Kung Fu, the Invisible Fist (1972); also writer
 Meng hu xia shan (1973)
 Call Me Dragon (1974); also producer and writer
 Little Superman (1974); also writer
 The Godfather Squad (1974); also writer
 Shi san hao xiong zhai (1975)
 Lian zheng feng bo (1975); also writer
 Secret Rivals (1976)
 Kung-Fu Sting (1976); also writer
 Bruce Lee: The Man, The Myth (1976); also writer
 Kidnap in Rome (1976); also producer
 Secret Rivals 2 (1977); also producer and co-writer
 The Invincible Armour (1977)
 What Price Stardom? (1977); also producer
 The Ring of Death (1980); also producer and writer
 Game of Death II (1980); also producer
 Tiger and Crane Shaolin Kung Fu (1982)
 The Unwritten Law (1985); also producer and writer
 The Music Box (2006); (uncredited)
 Evening of Roses (2009); also producer

As producer
 Hong lou chun shang chun (1978)
 Snake in the Eagle's Shadow (1978); also writer
 Drunken Master (1978); also writer
 Dance of the Drunk Mantis (1979); also writer
 The Butterfly Murders (1979)
 She mao he hun xing quan (1980)
 We're Going to Eat You (1980)
 Ta Bei wu ai (1980)
 Shuang la (1980)
 The Sweet and Sour Cops (1981); also writer
 Legend of a Fighter (1982); also writer
 Ninja in the Dragon's Den (1982); also writer
 The Sweet and Sour Cops Part II (1982)
 Hao cai zhuang dao ni (1984); also writer
 No Retreat, No Surrender (1986); also writer
 Hun wai qing (1988)
 Walk on Fire (1988)
 Once Upon a Time in China II (1992)
 Once Upon a Time in China III (1993)
 Once Upon a Time in China IV (1993)
 Once Upon a Time in China V (1994)
 Ren yue huang hun (1995)
 The Soong Sisters'' (1997)

References

Some additional film information taken from Ng See-yuen's entry at HK Cinemagic.

External links
 Ng See-Yuen at hkmdb.com
 The Hong Kong Film Development Council
 The Hong Kong Film Services Office
 Official site of UME Cineplex

1944 births
Chinese film directors
Chinese film producers
Chinese screenwriters
Film directors from Shanghai
Hong Kong film directors
Hong Kong film producers
Hong Kong screenwriters
Living people
Members of the Election Committee of Hong Kong, 2017–2021
Members of the Selection Committee of Hong Kong
Screenwriters from Shanghai